Congar is both a given name and surname. Notable people with the name include:

Saint Congar of Congresbury
Saint Cyngar of Llangefni
Yves Congar (1904–1995), French theologian and cardinal

See also
Conjar